Delturus is a genus of armored catfishes native to rivers in Southeast and Northeast Brazil.

Species
There are currently four recognized species in this genus:
 Delturus angulicauda (Steindachner, 1877)
 Delturus brevis Reis & Pereira, 2006
 Delturus carinotus (La Monte, 1933)
 Delturus parahybae Eigenmann & Eigenmann, 1889

References

Loricariidae
Fish of South America
Catfish genera
Taxa named by Rosa Smith Eigenmann
Taxa named by Carl H. Eigenmann
Freshwater fish genera